Jean-Paul Fitoussi (19 August 1942 – 15 April 2022) was a French economist and sociologist of Sephardi Jewish descent.

Biography 
Born in La Goulette, French Protectorate of Tunisia, Fitoussi earned his Ph.D. cum laude in Law and Economics from the University of Strasbourg. From 1979 until 1983, he was a professor at the European University Institute in Florence, and a visiting professor at the University of California, Los Angeles, in 1984. He was a professor of economics at the Institut d'études politiques de Paris, where he taught since 1982. He was also Professor Emeritus at LUISS "Guido Carli" University, in Rome. He published numerous articles, books and essays. He is considered to be one of the intellectual leaders of neo-keynesianism of these past 40 years, but claims to have a "very heterodox" vision.

In 2012 was published his book Macroeconomic Theory And Economic Policy: Essays in Honour of Jean-Paul Fitoussi. Edited by Vela Velupillai, it contained contributions from Nobel Prize winning economists Kenneth Arrow, Jean Tirole & Robert Solow as well as Olivier Blanchard & Edmond Malinvaud.
In 2014 was published Fruitful Economics, Papers in honor of and by Jean-Paul Fitoussi. The book is divided in five chapters, written respectively by Kenneth Arrow, Joseph Stiglitz, Edmund Phelps, Robert Solow, and Amartya Sen, all of whom worked with Jean Paul Fitoussi at different points in their lives.

From 2000 to 2009 he was an expert at the European Parliament, Commission of Monetary and Economic Affairs. He was also a member of the "Centre for Capitalism and Society" at Columbia University, and a member of the Economic Commission of the Nation since 1997. From 2008 to 2009, he was a member of the UN Commission on the Reform of the International Monetary and Financial System and Coordinator of the Commission on the Measurement of Economic Performance and Social Progress.

In 2013, Sciences Po, a leading French University, set up a day in celebration of Dr. Fitoussi's career, uniting him with economists Joseph Stiglitz, Edmund Phelps, Kenneth Arrow, Robert Solow and Amartya Sen, to debate on the major "fitoussian" issues: European integration, inequality, well‐being and environmental sustainability, and the European democratic deficit. The event was concluded by speeches from then French Minister of Foreign Affairs Laurent Fabius and by French President Francois Hollande.

Fitoussi has received the "Association Français de Sciences Économiques Prix" (French Association for Economic Sciences Award), and the "Rossi Award" from the "Académie des Sciences Morales et Politiques" (Academy of Moral and Political Sciences). He has been also awarded various honours including the Honorary Deanship of the Faculty of Economics in Strasbourg University, Honoris Causa degree at the Buenos Aires University, and in his own country with the decorations of "Chevalier de l'Ordre National du Mérite" (Knight of the National Order of Merit) and "Chevalier de la Legion d'Honneur" (Knight of the Legion of Honour). He is also Officer of the "Order of Prince Henry of Portugal".

In 2017, he declared his support for Presidential candidate Emmanuel Macron. As of September 2020, Fitoussi was a member of the Italian Aspen Institute.

Selected publications

References

External links 
 Curriculum Vitae at Sciences Po
 LUISS International Relations Master's Degree

1942 births
2022 deaths
Tunisian Jews
20th-century French Sephardi Jews
French economists
French people of Tunisian-Jewish descent
Officiers of the Légion d'honneur
University of Strasbourg alumni
Academic staff of Sciences Po
People from Tunis Governorate